Erythrophleum succirubrum is a species of leguminous tree in the genus Erythrophleum. Endemic to Thailand, the seeds of the plant are poisonous if ingested.

References

Flora of Thailand
succirubrum